Wanli was the era name of the Chinese Ming dynasty.

Wanli may also refer to:

Wanli Emperor (1563–1620), the 14th emperor of the Chinese Ming dynasty
Wanli District, Nanchang, district of Nanchang, Jiangxi, China
Wanli District, New Taipei, a district in New Taipei, Taiwan
Wan Li (1916–2015), Chinese Communist revolutionary and politician who served successively as Vice Premier, Chairman of the Standing Committee of the National People's Congress (NPC), and a member of the Chinese Communist Party (CCP) Secretariat and its Politburo.
Fang Hui (1227–1307), or Wanli, Chinese historian
Wanli River tributary of the Hualien River in Taiwan
Wanli Education Group, group in Zhejiang, China